

List of rulers of the Akan state of Denkyira (formerly Agona)
(Dates in italics indicate de facto continuation of office)

See also
Akan people
Ghana
Gold Coast
Lists of incumbents

Ghanaian royalty
Rulers
Lists of African rulers